Tad M. Schmaltz (born 1960) is a professor of philosophy at the University of Michigan, Ann Arbor. Prior to that, he was a professor of philosophy at Duke University, where he began his teaching career in 1989. He graduated magna cum laude with a BA in philosophy from Kalamazoo College in 1983, received his doctorate in 1988 from the University of Notre Dame. He is the author of Malebranche's Theory of the Soul (Oxford University Press, 1996) and Radical Cartesianism (Cambridge University Press, 2002). He is editor of the Journal of the History of Philosophy.

Schmaltz spent his early childhood in Ft. Wayne, Indiana, before moving to Ann Arbor, Michigan, where he attended St. Paul Lutheran School on Earhart Road.

See also
American philosophy
List of American philosophers

External links 
Tad Schmaltz's Duke page

Duke University faculty
20th-century American philosophers
21st-century American philosophers
Philosophers of mind
Philosophers from Michigan
University of Notre Dame alumni
1960 births
Living people
Kalamazoo College alumni
University of Michigan faculty